The Berlin Poets' Club ( (1928–1933) was a group of Russian émigré poets. Members included:
 Mikhail Gorlin (leader of the club)
 Raisa Blokh (wife of M. Gorlin)
 Vladimir Korvin-Piotrovskii
 Nina Korvin-Piotrovskaia
 Vladimir Sirin (Nabokov)
 Vera Nabokov
 Yuri Ofrosimov
 Sofiya Pregel
 Boris Vilde
 Yuri Dzhanumov
 Nikolai Belotsvetov
 Yevgueni Rabinovich,  and some others.

The club had to stop its activities in 1933 when the Nazis came to power, as many of its members were Jewish. Most of them moved to Paris, where later some of them were killed during the Holocaust.

Literature 
 Amory Burchard: Klubs der russischen Dichter in Berlin 1920-1941. Institutionen des literarischen Lebens im Exil. Ed. Otto Sagner, Munich 2001, p. 239-283   ISBN 3-87690-759-4 
 Yevgenia Kannak, Berlinski kruzhok poetov (1928-1933). In: Russki almanakh. Ed. R. Guerra, S. Shakhovskaya, E. Ternovski. Paris 1981, p. 363–366.
 Eugenie Salkind: Die junge russische Literatur in der Emigration. In: Osteuropa 10. 1931. p. 575–590, retrieved 10 June 2020
 Thomas Urban: Russkiye pisateli v Berline v 20-е gody XX vekа. Saint Petersburg 2014, p. 263-282  ISBN 978-5-87417-494-1

Sources 
Some notes and correspondence from the Club are located in the Vladimir Korvin-Piotrovskii Papers at the Beinecke Library, Yale University.

External links 
 Russian writers in Berlin (in Russian)

Russian literary societies
Culture in Berlin
1928 establishments in Germany
1933 disestablishments in Germany